Gary Richard Holman (born January 25, 1944 in Long Beach, California) is a retired American professional baseball player. A first baseman and outfielder, he appeared in 116 games over two seasons (1968–69) in Major League Baseball for the Washington Senators.

Holman originally signed with the Los Angeles Dodgers in 1964 after attending the University of Southern California. The Senators acquired him in the first-year player draft then in existence, developed him further in their farm system, and promoted him to their MLB roster in late June  after 60 games in Triple-A.  Holman started in 13 games, ten as an outfielder, for the last-place club, and appeared in 30 contests as a backup to the Senators' regular first baseman, Mike Epstein. He collected 25 hits, including five doubles and one triple, and posted a batting average of .294 in 75 games. As a result, he was named to the 1968 Topps All-Star Rookie team.

He was sent to the minor leagues in June, and retired from baseball at season's end.

As a big leaguer, he batted .259 with nine runs batted in.

References

External links

1944 births
Living people
Baseball players from Long Beach, California
Buffalo Bisons (minor league) players
Burlington Senators players
Major League Baseball first basemen
Salisbury Dodgers players
Santa Barbara Dodgers players
USC Trojans baseball players
Washington Senators (1961–1971) players
York White Roses players